Nippon Kokan may refer to:
Nippon Kokan (NKK), a steelmaking and shipbuilding company, now part of JFE Holdings
NKK F.C., their former association football club until 1994